Events from the year 1975 in Kuwait.

Incumbents
Emir: Sabah Al-Salim Al-Sabah
Prime Minister: Jaber Al-Ahmad Al-Sabah

Events

Births

 21 March - Yacoub Al-Mohana.
 3 June - Faiz Mohammed Ahmed Al Kandari.
 18 June - Khalid Abdullah Mishal al Mutairi.

See also
Years in Jordan
Years in Syria

References

 
Kuwait
Kuwait
Years of the 20th century in Kuwait
1970s in Kuwait